Brebes District is a district (Indonesian: Kecamatan) and the capital of Brebes Regency, Central Java, Indonesia. It is bordered by Java Sea to the north, Tegal City (West Tegal District and Margadana District) and Tegal Regency (Dukuhturi District and Adiwerna District) to the east, Jatibarang District to the south and Wanasari District to the west. It covers 92.23 km2 and had a population of 157,149 at the 2010 Census and 182,421 at the 2020 Census.

History 
On early January 1950, DI/TII forces led by Amir Fatah briefly occupied Brebes. Later, they retreated from the town after facing a battle from TNI.

Administrative Villages 

Brebes District is divided into 23 administrative villages (5 kelurahan and 18 desa).

Desa 

 Banjaranyar
 Kaligangsa Kulon
 Kaligangsa Wetan
 Kalimati
 Kaliwlingi
 Kedunguter
 Krasak
 Lembarawa
 Padasugih
 Pagejugan
 Pemaron
 
 Randusanga Kulon
 Randusanga Wetan
 Sigambir
 Tengki
 Terlangu
 Wangandalem

Kelurahan 

 Brebes
 Gandasuli
 Limbangan Kulon
 Limbangan Wetan
 Pasar Batang

References 

Brebes Regency
Districts of Central Java